Glen Irwin (born March 1, 1951) is a Canadian former professional ice hockey player. He played in 233 WHA games with the Houston Aeros and Indianapolis Racers over parts of five seasons.

Career statistics

External links

1951 births
Binghamton Dusters players
Canadian ice hockey defencemen
Estevan Bruins players
Flint Generals players
Fort Worth Wings players
Houston Aeros (WHA) players
Houston Apollos players
Ice hockey people from Edmonton
Indianapolis Racers players
Living people
Oklahoma City Blazers (1965–1977) players
Philadelphia Flyers draft picks
Richmond Robins players
St. Catharines Black Hawks players
San Diego Gulls (WHL) players
Seattle Totems (WHL) players
Canadian expatriate ice hockey players in the United States